Ine Wannijn (born 11 April 1982) is a former Belgian racing cyclist. She won the Belgian national road race title in 2002.

References

External links

1982 births
Living people
Belgian female cyclists
People from Oudenaarde
Cyclists from East Flanders